Jesús Castillo Monterroso (1877-1946) was a Guatemalan composer. He is the older brother of composer Ricardo Castillo. He was the first musician to collect a sizable amount of Guatemalan folk music, which he later used in works such as his opera Quiché Vinak, as well as ouvertures and symphonic poems. His piano music, as well as his orchestral output, reflects the fusion of his contemporary art with Mayan mythology such as legends and myths from the Popol Vuh. The national youth orchestra of Guatemala, the Orquesta Sinfónica Jesús Castillo (established in 1997), was named in his honor.

References
 Dieter Lehnhoff. "Guatemala." Diccionario de la Música Española e Hispanoamericana, 10 vols., ed. Emilio Casares Rodicio. Madrid: Sociedad General de Autores y Editores, 2000, 6/1-11. 
 Dieter Lehnhoff. Creación musical en Guatemala. Guatemala City: Editorial Galería Guatemala, 2005.

External links
 

1877 births
1946 deaths
Guatemalan composers
Male composers
Guatemalan opera composers
Male classical composers